Gray zone, grayzone, grey zone, or greyzone may refer to:

Arts, entertainment, and media
 The Grey Zone (1997 film), an Italian film directed by Franco Bernini
 The Grey Zone, a 2001 American film directed by Tim Blake Nelson
 Greyzone, a 2018 Swedish-Danish drama series
 The Grayzone, a news website founded by Max Blumenthal

Other uses
 Gray Zone in Aegean Sea
 Gray zone lymphoma, a type of cancer
 Primo Levi's grey zone, a moral concept about the Holocaust
 Grey-zone (international relations), the space between war and peace

See also 
 Grey area (disambiguation)